Stringed Works is a compilation album by German electronic composer Peter Frohmader, released in 1994 by Multimood. It comprises the EP Wintermusic / Bass Symphony No. 3 with several previously unreleased pieces.

Track listing

Personnel
Adapted from the Stringed Works liner notes.
 Peter Frohmader – bass guitar (1, 2, 3), fretless bass guitar (1, 3), eight-string bass guitar (1, 3), choir (3, 4), double bass (1), electric guitar (2), acoustic twelve-string guitar (2), electronics (2), six-string bass guitar (3), Chapman Stick (4)
 Birgit Metzger – vocals (3, 4)

Release history

References 

1994 compilation albums
Peter Frohmader albums